Gabrielle Ferrari (14 September 1851 – 4 July 1921) was a French pianist and composer noted for opera. Born Gabrielle Colombari, she was born and died in Paris and studied with Charles Gounod and Théodore Dubois. Her opera Le Cobzar premiered in Monte Carlo.

She married François Ferrari with whom she had four daughters.

Works

Ferrari composed operas and songs, writing her own text, and also for orchestral and piano performance. Selected works include:
Le Tartare, (1906) opera
Le dernier amour, (1895) opera
Le Cobzar, (1909) opera
Feuilles d'album, Op. 76
Feuille morte
Menuet
Nirvana
Fantasie Symphonique
Jeanne d'Arc

References

External links
 

1851 births
1921 deaths
19th-century classical composers
20th-century classical composers
French music educators
Italian classical composers
Italian opera composers
20th-century Italian composers
19th-century Italian composers
19th-century French composers
Women opera composers
20th-century French women musicians
20th-century French composers
Women music educators
French classical composers
French women classical composers
20th-century women composers
19th-century women composers